The Women's individual compound open is one of the events held in archery at the 2012 Summer Paralympics in London.

Results

Ranking round

Competition bracket

Finals

Section 1

Section 2

References 

W
2012 in women's archery